Mohammad  Faisal Yousef Abu Zrayq is known also as Sharara is a Jordanian footballer who plays as a winger for Tunisian club Espérance de Tunis.

Club career 
He started his career for Al-Ramtha and was loaned to Al-Sailiya in the summer of 2019.
On 9 January 2022, he joined Libyan club Al Ahli on a free transfer.
On 15 August 2022, he joined Tunisian club Espérance de Tunis, in a three-year deal.

International career 

Sharara played his first international match with the Jordan national team against Slovakia in a friendly match on 7 June 2019. He was named in Jordan's squad for the 2021 FIFA Arab Cup.

International goals

References

External links

1997 births
Jordanian footballers
Jordanian expatriate footballers
Jordan international footballers
Association football midfielders
Al-Ramtha SC players
Al-Sailiya SC players
Al-Ahli SC (Tripoli) players
Espérance Sportive de Tunis players
Libyan Premier League players
Jordanian Pro League players
Qatar Stars League players
Tunisian Ligue Professionnelle 1 players
Expatriate footballers in Qatar
Expatriate footballers in Libya
Jordanian expatriate sportspeople in Qatar
Jordanian expatriate sportspeople in Libya
Living people